Nahakul Subedi (born 22 June 1971) is a justice of the Supreme Court of Nepal. The Nepalese Supreme Court is composed of the Chief Justice, and twenty Justices. The Chief Justice is appointed by the President on the recommendation of the Constitutional Council.

See also
List of sitting judges of the Supreme Court of Nepal

References

1971 births
Living people
Justices of the Supreme Court of Nepal
Place of birth missing (living people)